Birgit Speh (born 1949) is Goldwin Smith Professor of Mathematics at Cornell University. She is known for her work in Lie groups, including Speh representations (also known as Speh's representations).

Career
Speh received her Ph.D. from Massachusetts Institute of Technology in 1977. She was the first female mathematician to be given tenure by Cornell University, and the first to receive the title of Professor.

Awards and honors

In 2012, Speh became a fellow of the American Mathematical Society.  She was selected to give the 2020 AWM-AMS Emmy Noether Lecture at the 2020 Joint Mathematics Meetings.

Selected publications
Speh, Birgit; Vogan, David A. Jr. Reducibility of generalized principal series representations. Acta Math. 145 (1980)
Speh, Birgit. Unitary representations of Gl(n,R) with nontrivial (g,K)-cohomology. Invent. Math. 71 (1983), no. 3, 443–465.
Speh, Birgit. The unitary dual of Gl(3,R) and Gl(4,R). Math. Ann. 258 (1981/82), no. 2, 113–133.

References

Living people
1949 births
American women mathematicians
20th-century American mathematicians
21st-century American mathematicians
Massachusetts Institute of Technology alumni
Cornell University faculty
Fellows of the American Mathematical Society
Group theorists
20th-century women mathematicians
21st-century women mathematicians
20th-century American women
21st-century American women